San Juan United FC is a Puerto Rican soccer team that plays in the Puerto Rico Soccer League 2nd Division.
They also play in the Liga Nacional.

2008 season
The team finished with a record of 3-1-3.

Liga Nacional
The team lost their first game 4-0 to Club Deportivo Gallitos

Current squad

References

Football clubs in Puerto Rico
Puerto Rico Soccer League 2nd Division
Liga Nacional de Fútbol de Puerto Rico teams